Galicia Sempre (Ga.S) is a centre-left political party in Galicia, Spain, led by the mayor of Becerreá and ex-MP Manuel Martínez Núñez.

History
The party was created as the result of a split in the Lugo branch of the Spanish Socialist Workers' Party (PSOE). The party defines itself as social democratic and galicianist. In the municipal elections of 2019 Ga.S won 9 local seats in three municipalities: Becerreá, Sarria and Meira.

Electoral performance

References

Social democratic parties in Spain
Socialist parties in Galicia (Spain)